Coleman Hollow is a valley in Reynolds County in the U.S. state of Missouri.

Coleman Hollow has the name of the local Coleman family.

References

Valleys of Reynolds County, Missouri
Valleys of Missouri